Guo Xinghong (born 1 April 1972) is a road cyclist from China. She represented her nation at the 1996 Summer Olympics in the women's road race.

References

External links
 profile at sports-reference.com

1972 births
Living people
Chinese female cyclists
Cyclists at the 1996 Summer Olympics
Olympic cyclists of China
Cyclists at the 1994 Asian Games
Cyclists at the 2002 Asian Games
Medalists at the 1994 Asian Games
Place of birth missing (living people)
Asian Games medalists in cycling
Asian Games gold medalists for China
20th-century Chinese women